The 1689 Brașov fire took place in the town of Brassó in the Principality of Transylvania (now Brașov, in Romania; German Kronstadt). It broke out on the afternoon of 21 April in the lower (i.e. southwestern) parts of Burggasse and Schwarzgasse streets (today Str. Castelului and Str. Nicolae Bălcescu). Spread by a powerful wind, it soon engulfed the entire part of the town facing the Tâmpa mountain. Local fires also appeared in Roßmarkt (today Str. George Barițiu) and Purzengasse (today Str. Republicii). Within a few hours, the entire town was in flames. The White Tower, the Black Tower, the Council House and the Black Church were all damaged. Church services were held outdoors for a long time. Johannes Honter's renowned library also perished.

Some people claim that the blaze was set deliberately by Habsburg troops during the Great Turkish War as a revenge for the Ottomans burning parts of Vienna. After the fire in 1689, the Ottoman Army garrison fled the town.

Around 300 people died, the town was practically destroyed and its economic power was severed. For years, Kronstadt remained a ruin city blackened by smoke with a lingering penetrating smell. Most houses were of wood, which facilitated the spread of flames. Moreover, water was scarce in the mountain town. Subsequently, the authorities banned wooden houses, which is why the historic center of Brașov features only stone and brick houses. Reconstruction of the city took over many decades.

A common misconception is that the Black Church got its name because it was sooted by the fire. However, 21st century studies have found no layers of fire destruction; the church has blackened simply because of environmental pollution after Brașov has turned into an industrial city. Furthermore, the name "Black Church" was not used until the end of the 19th century.

References

1689 fires
Brașov
Fires in Romania
Fire